Quill Lake is a village in the Canadian province of Saskatchewan within the Rural Municipality of Lakeside No. 338 and Census Division No. 10. It is 170 km east of Saskatoon and 200 km northeast of Regina on Highway 5.

The village is located just to the northwest of the Quill Lakes. The Quill Lakes wetland complex is a designated Western Hemisphere Shorebird Reserve Network site where many migrating shorebirds stop during long migrations. Because of this the village is also known by its residents as the "Goose Capital of Saskatchewan".

History 
Quill Lake was originally established as Lally, named after a railway official of the day. Later it was renamed Quill Lake to conform to the name of the post office. The community was built around the site which was originally the location of a log school house. Quill Lake incorporated as a village on December 8, 1906.

Heritage sites
Quill Lake has one municipal heritage building, the St. Michael's Anglican Church, constructed between 1907 and 1913. The wood building was built in the Gothic revival style and has a fieldstone foundation. It was previously known as the Quill Lake United Church and the Quill Lake Methodist Church. The building was designated a heritage building in 2000.

Demographics 

Notable people
 Ray Meiklejohn, former Saskatchewan cabinet minister
 Lyle Odelein, former NHL hockey player
 Selmar Odelein, former NHL hockey player

References 

Villages in Saskatchewan
Lakeside No. 338, Saskatchewan
Division No. 10, Saskatchewan